Euclid Apartments is an historic structure located in the Adams Morgan neighborhood of Washington, D.C.  The building was completed in 1920 and contains 47 units.  The building was renovated from 2009 to 2011.  It was listed on the National Register of Historic Places in 2010.

References

Apartment buildings in Washington, D.C.
Residential buildings completed in 1920
Residential buildings on the National Register of Historic Places in Washington, D.C.
Adams Morgan
1920 establishments in Washington, D.C.